Steromphala pennanti is a species of small sea snail, a marine gastropod mollusc in the family Trochidae, the top snails.

The species was named in honor of Thomas Pennant (1726 – 1798), a Welsh naturalist.

Description
The size of the shell varies between 10 mm and 16 mm. The shell is more depressed than Gibbula cineraria, and (although the base is flatter) never inclined to a pyramidal form. The spiral ridges are sharper and fewer, especially in the young. The present species is usually more widely umbilicate and broader than Gibbula cineraria. The coloring is different; both have a similar kind of marking, but in the present species the longitudinal rays or streaks are red, besides being broader and not half so many as in the other species.  And they are sometimes zigzag, instead of being broken into spots or interrupted by the sculpture. This species is striped, the other lineated. Just within the outer lip are two borders, one of yellow, the other of green variegated by red spots. This edging is minutely tubercled like shagreen.

Distribution
This species occurs in the North Sea and off Spain.

References

 Gmelin J. F., 1791: Caroli Linnaei systema Naturae per regna tria naturae. Editio decimatertia, aucta, reformata, Vermes Testacea ; Leipzig [Lipsiae] 1 (6): 3021-3910
 Lowe, R. T. (1861). A list of shells observed or collected at Mogador and in its immediate environs, during a few days' visit to the place, in April 1859. Proceedings of the Zoological Society of London. 1860: 169-204 ["1860"]. London.
 Gofas, S.; Le Renard, J.; Bouchet, P. (2001). Mollusca, in: Costello, M.J. et al. (Ed.) (2001). European register of marine species: a check-list of the marine species in Europe and a bibliography of guides to their identification. Collection Patrimoines Naturels, 50: pp. 180–213

External links 
 www.anemoon.org
 
 [Gibbula pennanti (Philippi, 1846) Aradas A., 1847: Descrizione delle conchiglie fossili di Gravitelli presso Messina ; Atti dell'Accademia Gioenia di Scienze Naturali (2) 4: 57-88]
 Monterosato T. A. (di), 1888-1889: Molluschi del Porto di Palermo. Specie e varietà; Bullettino della Società Malacologica Italiana, Pisa 13 (1888[1889?): 161-180 14 (1889): 75-81]
 Affenzeller S., Haar N. & Steiner G. (2017). Revision of the genus complex Gibbula: an integrative approach to delineating the Eastern Mediterranean genera Gibbula Risso, 1826, Steromphala Gray, 1847, and Phorcus Risso, 1826 using DNA-barcoding and geometric morphometrics (Vetigastropoda, Trochoidea). Organisms Diversity & Evolution. 17(4): 789-812

pennanti
Gastropods described in 1846
Taxa named by Rodolfo Amando Philippi